The Art Institute of Tampa is a for profit institution providing education in design, media arts, fashion and culinary arts.

The Art Institute of Tampa opened in 2004. The Art Institute of Tampa was the 30th location within The Art Institutes system of schools.

The Art Institute of Tampa is a branch of Miami International University of Art & Design, which is accredited by the Commission on Colleges of the Southern Association of Colleges and Schools (SACS).

Culinary program
The Art Institute of Tampa's culinary program garnered much attention. In 2006, its culinary students and staff volunteered to create the menu, make a budget, and prepare and serve the food for a Pinellas County Habitat for Humanity charity event called Building Dreams. In 2007, articles in the St. Petersburg Times indicated that the school had been a sponsor of the Best Teen Chef competition.

Programs
All bachelor programs as of 5/24/2022 have a full tuition rate of $103,500.

Bachelor of Fine Arts Programs

Digital Filmmaking & Video Production
Digital Photography
Game Art & Design
Graphic Design
Interior Design
Media Arts & Animation
Visual Effects & Motion Graphics
Web Design & Interactive Media

Bachelor of Arts Programs

Advertising
Culinary Management
Fashion & Retail Management
Food & Beverage Management

Associate of Arts Programs

Culinary Arts
Baking & Pastry
Web Design & Interactive Media
Wine, Spirits & Beverage Management
Graphic Design

Diploma Programs

Baking & Pastry

Student outcomes

According to the College Navigator, the school has an overall graduation rate of 22 percent.

References

External links
The Art Institute of Tampa official website

Tampa
Educational institutions established in 2004
Private universities and colleges in Florida
Cooking schools in the United States
Education in Tampa, Florida
Universities and colleges in Hillsborough County, Florida
2004 establishments in Florida